Lars Erik Taxell (6 April 1913 – 7 October 2013), was a Finnish legal scholar and politician. He was the leader of the Swedish People's Party of Finland in 1956–1966. He was also the Rector of the Åbo Akademi University in Turku, Finland, in the 1950s and its chancellor in the 1980s.

Taxell was born in Vaasa, in the Grand Duchy of Finland in 1913. He studied law at the University of Helsinki. He earned a PhD in law in 1946, which dealt with the fundamental question of the relationship between democracy and the rule of law. In 1948–1976, he was a professor of private law with jurisprudence at the Åbo Academy. His extensive scientific production were mainly corporate law and contract law, later also issues related to law and democracy. As the first person from Finland, Taxell was awarded the Nordic Lawyer Prize in 1984. He served as Chancellor of Åbo Akademy University in 1981–1984, the early years when the private Åbo Akademy became a state university. In 1975 Taxell became an honorary doctor at the Faculty of law at Stockholm University.

In 1956, Taxell succeeded Ernst von Born as the leader of the Swedish People's Party, the Swedish-speaking minority and mainly liberal party in Finland; a position he held until 1966 when he was succeeded by Jan-Magnus Jansson. He had a central role in the agreement whereby the Finnish government in 1981 took over the financial responsibility for the private university Åbo Akademi, while the Åbo Akademi Foundation maintained its independent status. Taxell died in 2013 at the age of 100, in Åbo, Finland.

References 

1913 births
2013 deaths
People from Vaasa
People from Vaasa Province (Grand Duchy of Finland)
Swedish-speaking Finns
Finnish Lutherans
Swedish People's Party of Finland politicians
Finnish academic administrators
Academic staff of the University of Helsinki
Åbo Akademi University
Finnish centenarians
Men centenarians
20th-century Finnish educators
20th-century Finnish politicians
21st-century Finnish educators
21st-century Finnish politicians
Rectors of universities and colleges in Finland
20th-century Lutherans